Rafael Corpus (October 24, 1880 – July 21, 1960) was a Philippine economist, politician, and statesman who served as both chairman and president of the Philippine National Bank. Corpus was born in San Antonio, Zambales, Philippines, and finished his Bachelor of Arts degree at the Ateneo de Manila University in 1897. He then studied at the University of Santo Tomas and later studied law at Escuela de Derecho in 1903. He then went to the United States to take up a post graduate course at George Washington University in 1905.

He represented the province of Zambales's lone district as an assemblyman in the Third Philippine Legislature in 1912. He was appointed Solicitor General in 1914, a position he held until 1916. He became Secretary of Agriculture and Natural Resources in 1922. During the so-called Cabinet Crisis of 1923, he, together with other Cabinet Secretaries, resigned en masse over a dispute with Governor General Leonard Wood. He was the Chairman of the Philippine National Bank from 1923 to 1931 before becoming its President from 1932–1935. He was a member of the first Monetary Board of the Central Bank of the Philippines in 1949. He devoted more than thirty years to public service occupying various other important government positions.

A nephew of the philanthropist Teodoro R. Yangco, he successfully managed the latter's various business enterprises and became Administrator of his Estate.

He was married to Eluteria Pablo with whom he had six children, including Sergio P. Corpus, a notable businessman.

References

Additional References 

G.R. No. L-22469 October 23, 1978 TOMAS CORPUS, plaintiff-appellant, vs. ADMINISTRATOR and/or EXECUTOR of the Estate of Teodoro R. Yangco

 Isagani A. Cruz (March 12, 2000) SEPARATE COLUMN “The Cabinet Crisis of 1923” Philippine Daily Inquirer
 "Rafael M. Corpus: A life of Total Service" Philbank News (a newsletter of the Philippines National Bank]

Members of the House of Representatives of the Philippines from Zambales
1960 deaths
Ateneo de Manila University alumni
George Washington University alumni
University of Santo Tomas alumni
Secretaries of Agriculture of the Philippines
Secretaries of Environment and Natural Resources of the Philippines
Solicitors General of the Philippines
People from Zambales
1880 births
Members of the Philippine Legislature